Kuijer is a surname. Notable people with the surname include:

Guus Kuijer (born 1942), Dutch author
Ruud Kuijer (born 1959), Dutch sculptor

See also
Kuiper